Dara Friedman (born 1968, Bad Kreuznach, Germany) is an artist who creates film and video works that use a carefully orchestrated filming and editing process, often collaborating with individuals and communities to capture the expressive qualities of the human body.

Background 
Friedman was raised between Palm Beach County and Bad Kreuznach, Germany. Her mother is an artist and her father was a Jewish doctor in the United States Army and stationed in Germany during her youth. As a child, she took dance lessons and would attend dress rehearsals at the Düsseldorf Ballet where her aunt, was a dancer. Dancers and performers feature frequently in Friedman's works, such as Dancer (2011), Play (Parts 1 & 2) (2013), Rite (2014), and Mother Drum (2015–16).

She received her BA from Vassar College in 1990, and studied at the Städelshule in Frankfurt from 1989–91. In 1994 she received an MFA, Motion Pictures from the School of Communication at the University of Miami. Friedman studied under Austrian artist and Structural film pioneer Peter Kubelka, and describes her work as a form of poetry that communicates visually without a reliance on verbal or traditional, narrative storytelling. In 1992, she moved to Miami where she continues to participate as an active member in the artistic community.

Work and career 

Friedman's film and video work is regarded for its ability to reduce film to its most basic, material essences in ways that create emotionally compelling, visceral experiences. She often works in 16mm and Super 8 film formats, although also using standard and high-definition cameras. A rigorous planning and editing process creates a visceral visual experience that is complemented by the unpredictability of the human subjects she often works with. The artist establishes relationships with the people who perform directly for her camera, sometimes identified through a casting call, in order to create intimate filming environments that capture an element of natural spontaneity. Although these films do not have linear narratives, the calculated presentation of bodies in motion encourages the viewer to connect with the subjects and places on screen. Since the 1990s, Friedman has created film, videos, and installations that integrate these elements of structured and dynamic visuals. She is represented by Gavin Brown's enterprise, who has consistently featured Friedman's work since 1998.

Exhibitions  
The artist's first mid-career survey was organized by the Pérez Art Museum Miami by René Morales in 2017, and featured fifteen installations of her video works spanning the course of twenty years.

Solo exhibitions 
Solo exhibitions of Friedman's work have also include:
 1998: Dara Friedman: Total, Museum of Contemporary Art, Chicago
 2001: Dara Friedman, SITE Santa Fe
 2002: Dara Friedman, Kunstmuseum Thun
 2005: Dara Friedman: Sunset Island, The Kitchen
 2007: Musical, Public Art Fund
 2009: Musical, The Museum of Modern Art
 2009: Shooting Gallery, Julia Stoschek Collection
 2012: Dara Friedman: Dancer, Contemporary Art Museum, Raleigh
 2012: Dara Friedman: Dancer, Miami Art Museum
 2013: Dara Friedman: Dancer, Centre for Contemporary Art Ujazdowski Castle
 2013: Hammer Projects: Dara Friedman, Hammer Museum
 2014: Dara Friedman: Projecting, Museum of Contemporary Art Detroit
 2014: Play (Parts 1 & 2), Hammer Museum
 2017: Mother Drum, Aspen Art Museum
 2018: Dara Friedman: Perfect Stranger Perez Modern Art Museum
 2019/20: Dara Friedman: Temple Door - Kunstverein Harburger Bahnhof, Hamburg, Germany

Collections 
Among the public collections holding work by Friedman are the Austrian Film Museum, Vienna; Bard College, Annandale-on-Hudson, New York; Hammer Museum, Los Angeles; Institute of Contemporary Art, Miami; Museum of Modern Art, New York; Pérez Art Museum Miami; Saint Louis Museum of Art; and the Whitney Museum of American Art, New York.

Awards 
Friedman has been recognized with the following awards:
 2019: Guggenheim Fellowship
 2016: South Florida Cultural Consortium Fellowship
 2012: Hammer Museum Artist Residency
 2000: Rome Prize, American Academy in Rome
 1999: Louis Comfort Tiffany Foundation Grant
 1998: South Florida Cultural Consortium Fellowship
 1997: New Forms Miami, Miami-Dade Department of Cultural Affairs

Personal life 
Friedman is married to artist Mark Handforth. They live and work in Miami with their two daughters.

References

External links 

Official Website

1968 births
Living people
20th-century American women artists
21st-century American women artists
Artists from Florida
American video artists
People from Bad Kreuznach,
University of Miami alumni
Vassar College alumni